Charles IX, also Carl (4 October 1550 – 30 October 1611), reigned as King of Sweden from 1604 until his death. He was the youngest son of King Gustav I and of his second wife, Margaret Leijonhufvud, the brother of King Eric XIV and of King John III, and the uncle of Sigismund, who became king both of Sweden and of Poland. By his father's will Charles received, by way of appanage, the Duchy of Södermanland, which included the provinces of Närke and Värmland; but he did not come into actual possession of them till after the fall of Eric and the succession to the throne of John in 1568.

Both Charles and one of his predecessors, Eric XIV, took their regnal numbers according to a fictitious history of Sweden. He was actually the third Swedish king called Charles.

He came into the throne by championing the Protestant cause during the increasingly tense times of religious strife between competing sects of Christianity. Just under a decade after his death, these would re-ignite in the Thirty Years' War of 1618-1648. These conflicts had already caused the dynastic squabble rooted in religious freedom that deposed Charles' nephew (Sigismund III) and brought Charles to rule as king of Sweden.

His reign marked the start of the final chapter (dated 1648 by some) both of the Reformation and of the Counter-Reformation.  With the death of his brother John III of Sweden in November 1592, the Swedish throne went to his nephew, the Habsburg ally Sigismund of Poland and Sweden.  During these tense political times, Charles viewed the inheritance of the throne of Protestant Sweden by his devout Roman-Catholic nephew with alarm.  Several years of religious controversy and discord followed.

While King Sigismund resided in Poland, Charles and the Swedish privy council ruled in Sigismund's name. After various preliminaries, the Riksdag of the Estates forced Sigismund to abdicate the throne to Charles IX in 1595.   This eventually kicked off nearly seven decades of sporadic warfare as the two lines of the divided House of Vasa both continued to attempt to remake the union between the Polish and Swedish thrones with opposing counter-claims and dynastic wars.

Quite likely, the dynastic outcome between the Swedish and Polish representatives of the House of Vasa exacerbated and radicalized the later actions of Europe's Catholic princes in the German states such as the Edict of Restitution of 1629.  In fact, it worsened European politics to the abandonment or prevention of settling events by diplomacy and compromise during the vast bloodletting of the Thirty Years' War.

Duke

In 1568, he was the real leader of the rebellion against Eric XIV.   However, he took no part in the designs of his brother John III against the unhappy king after his deposition. Charles's relations with John were always more or less strained. He was at least suspected of being implicated in the Mornay Plot to depose John III in 1574, and was one of the alternative regents suggested by the conspirators of the 1576 Plot. He had no sympathy with John's High-Church tendencies on the one hand, and he sturdily resisted all the king's endeavours to restrict his authority as Duke of Södermanland on the other. The nobility and the majority of the Riksdag of the Estates supported John. However, in his endeavours to unify the realm, and Charles had consequently (1587) to resign his pretensions to autonomy within his duchy. But, steadfast Lutheran as he was, on the religious question he was immovable. The matter came to a crisis on the death of John III in 1592. The heir to the throne was John's eldest son, Sigismund III Vasa, already king of Poland and a devoted Catholic. The fear that Sigismund might re-catholicize the land alarmed the Protestant majority in Sweden—particularly the commoners and lower nobility, and Charles came forward as their champion, and also as the defender of the Vasa dynasty against foreign interference.

It was due entirely to him that Sigismund as king-elect was forced to confirm the resolutions at the Uppsala Synod in 1593, thereby recognizing the fact that Sweden was essentially a Lutheran Protestant state. Under the agreement, Charles and the Swedish Privy Council shared power and ruled in Sigismund's place since he resided in Poland. In the ensuing years 1593–1595, Charles's task was extraordinarily difficult. He had steadily to oppose Sigismund's reactionary tendencies and directives; he had also to curb the nobility which sought to increase their power at the expense of the absent king, which he did with cruel rigor.

Necessity compelled him to work with the clergy and people rather than the gentry; hence it was that the Riksdag of the Estates assumed under his regency government a power and an importance which it had never possessed before. In 1595, the Riksdag of Söderköping elected Charles regent, and his attempt to force Klas Flemming, governor of Österland (Finland of the day), to submit to his authority, rather than to that of the king, provoked a civil war. Charles sought to increase his power and the king attempted to manage the situation by diplomacy over several years, until fed up, Sigismund got permission from the Commonwealth's legislature to pursue the matters dividing his Swedish subjects, and invaded with a mercenary army.

In April 1597, after having subdued the Cudgel War and preparing to resist the expected invasion of Charles, Fleming died and was succeeded as governor by Arvid Stålarm the Younger. In August 1597, Charles and his army invaded Österland, took Åland, which was the fief of her sister Queen Dowager Catherine, and besieged Turku Castle. Fleming was still not buried, and, according to legend, Charles had the coffin opened to reassure himself that Fleming was indeed dead. After having identified the face of Fleming, he was to have pulled Fleming's beard with the words, "If you had been alive, your head would not have been safe", upon which Fleming's wife Ebba Stenbock replied, "If my late husband was alive, Your Grace would never have been here."

Technically Charles was, without doubt, guilty of high treason, and the considerable minority of all classes which adhered to Sigismund on his landing in Sweden in 1598 indisputably behaved like loyal subjects. In the events that followed, despite some initial successes, Sigismund lost the crucial Battle of Stångebro, and was captured himself, as well as being forced to deliver up certain Swedish noblemen who were named traitor by Charles and the Riksens ständer and then executed in the Linköping Bloodbath. With Sigismund defeated and exiled, as both an alien and a heretic to the majority of the Swedish nation, and his formal deposition by the Riksdag of the Estates in 1599 was, in effect, a natural vindication and ex post facto legitimization of Charles's position all along, for the same session of the Riksens ständer named him as the ruler as regent.

King

Finally, the Riksdag at Linköping, 24 February 1604 declared that Sigismund abdicated the Swedish throne, that duke Charles was recognized as the sovereign. He was declared king as Karl IX (anglicized as Charles IX). Charles's short reign was one of uninterrupted warfare. The hostility of Poland and the breakup of Russia involved him in overseas contests for the possession of Livonia and Ingria, the Polish–Swedish War (1600–1611) and the Ingrian War, while his pretensions to claim Lappland brought upon him a war with Denmark-Norway in the last year of his reign.

In all these struggles, he was more or less unsuccessful, owing partly to the fact that he and his forces had to oppose superior generals (e.g. Jan Karol Chodkiewicz and Christian IV of Denmark) and partly to sheer ill-luck. Compared with his foreign policy, the domestic policy of Charles IX was comparatively unimportant. It aimed at confirming and supplementing what had already been done during his regency. He did not officially become king until 22 March 1604. The first deed in which the title appears is dated 20 March 1604; but he was not crowned until 15 March 1607.

Death and legacy

Four and a half years later Charles IX died at Nyköping, 30 October 1611 when he was succeeded by his seventeen-year-old son Gustavus Adolphus, who had participated in the wars. As a ruler, Charles is the link between his great father and his still greater son. He consolidated the work of Gustav I, the creation of a great Protestant state; he prepared the way for the erection of the Protestant empire of Gustavus Adolphus.

Ancestors

Children
He married, firstly, Anna Marie of Palatinate-Simmern (1561–1589), daughter of Louis VI, Elector Palatine (1539–1583) and Elisabeth of Hesse (1539–1584). Their children were:

 Margareta Elisabeth (1580–1585)
 Elisabeth Sabina (1582–1585)
 Louis (1583–1583)
 Catherine (1584–1638), married a prince of the Palatinate Zweibrücken, becoming mother of Charles X Gustav.
 Gustav (1587–1587)
 Maria (1588–1589)

In 1592 he married his second wife Christina of Holstein-Gottorp (1573–1625), daughter of Adolf of Holstein-Gottorp (1526–1586) and Christine of Hesse (1543–1604), and first cousin of his previous wife. Their children were:

 Christina (1593–1594)
 Gustavus Adolphus of Sweden (Gustav II Adolf) (1594–1632)
 Maria Elizabeth (1596–1618), married her first cousin Duke John, youngest son of John III of Sweden
 Charles Philip (1601–1622)

He also had a son with his mistress, Karin Nilsdotter:
 Carl Carlsson Gyllenhielm (1574–1650), Field Marshal

See also
 History of Sweden — Rise of Sweden as a Great Power
 Battle of Kircholm
 Battle of Stångebro
 Kings of Kvenland — although his successor dropped the title, Charles claimed to be King of the Caijaners from 1607 to 1611

References

External links
 
 
 

|-

1550 births
1611 deaths
17th-century Swedish monarchs
Regents of Sweden
People from Stockholm
Rulers of Finland
House of Vasa
Dukes of Södermanland
Dukes of Närke
People of the War against Sigismund
People of the Kalmar War